Harry Gilby is an English actor, best known for playing a young J. R. R. Tolkien in the film Tolkien (2019) and Æthelstan in the fifth series of The Last Kingdom (2022).

Early life
Harry Gilby was born in Nottingham, England in 2001 to parents Neil and Helen Gilby. He attended Sutton Bonington primary school before joining Trent College when he was 11. He began training at the Television Workshop in Nottingham when he was 12. Gilby played Nathan in the original cast of The Full Monty at the Noel Coward Theatre in London's West End.

Career
Gilby made his acting debut in 2016, when he played a village lad in an episode of Jericho. In 2017 he starred in the film Just Charlie, playing Charlie Lyndsay, a transgender girl with a special talent for playing football. He was nominated for Most Promising Newcomer at the British Independent Film Awards 2017 and Best Newcomer at the National Film Awards UK 2018 for his performance in Just Charlie. In 2018, he played Arlo in the short film Evie. In 2019, he played a young version of author J. R. R. Tolkien in Tolkien. He has also appeared in three episodes of Casualty as Toby Williams, a young boy dying of leukemia. In 2022, he played Æthelstan in the fifth series of The Last Kingdom. In 2023, he is set to reprise the role in the follow-up feature-length sequel Seven Kings Must Die.

Filmography

Film

Television

Awards and nominations

References

External links
 

2001 births
Living people
21st-century English male actors
English male film actors
English male television actors